Djamel Belalem (born 12 August 1993) is an Algerian footballer who plays as a midfielder for MC El Bayadh in the Algerian Ligue Professionnelle 1.

References

External links

1993 births
Living people
Association football midfielders
Algerian footballers
ASM Oran players
JS Saoura players
Olympique de Médéa players
WA Tlemcen players
21st-century Algerian people